Crassula elegans, the elegant crassula, is a flowering plant species in the genus Crassula.

Subspecies are:
 Crassula elegans ssp. elegans Schoenl. & Baker f.
 Crassula elegans ssp. namibensis (Friedr.) Toelken

References

External links

elegans
Plants described in 1902